The Fernvale Limestone is a geologic formation in Alabama, Arkansas, Illinois, Missouri,
Oklahoma, and Tennessee. It preserves fossils dating back to the Ordovician period.

Paleontology

Brachiopods
Lepidocyclus
L. cooperi
L. oblongus

Conodonts

 Acodus
 A. unicostatus
 Acontiodus
 A. alveolaris
 Ambalodus
 A. triangularis
 Amorphognatus
 A. ordovicica
 Aphelognathus
 A. polita
 Belodina
 B. compressa
 B. inclinata
 B. ornata
 B. penna
 B. profunda
 Cordylodus
 C. delicatus
 C. flexuosus

 Dichognathus
 D. brevis
 D. scotti
 D. typica
 Distacodus
 D. falcatus
 Drepanodus
 D. homocurvatus
 D. suberectus
 Eoligonodina
 E. delicata
 Icriodella
 I. superba
 Keislognathus
 K. gracilis
 Oistodus
 O. abundans
 O. inclinatus
 O. parallelus
 O. venustus

 Ozarkodina
 O. inclinata
 O. tenuis
 Paltodus
 P. trigonius
 Panderodus
 P. compressus
 P. ellisoni
 P. fornicalis
 P. gracilis
 P. homosimilaris
 P. panderi
 P. simplex
 P. sulcatus
 Phragmodus
 P. undatus
 Prioniodina
 P. furcata

 Rhynchognathodus
 R. divaricatus
 R. typicus
 Sagittodontus
 S. robustus
 Scolopodus
 S. insculptus
 Trichonodella
 T. exacta
 T. diminuta
 T. tenuis
 Zygognathus
 Z. curvata
 Z. mira

See also

 List of fossiliferous stratigraphic units in Arkansas
 List of fossiliferous stratigraphic units in Tennessee
 Paleontology in Arkansas
 Paleontology in Tennessee

References

 

Ordovician Arkansas
Ordovician geology of Tennessee
Ordovician southern paleotropical deposits